Branimir Poljac (born 17 May 1984) is a former Norwegian football striker who was playing for Konyaspor in Turkey before he had a car accident which ended his career. He has Croatian parents.

Career
Poljac started his career in Klemetsrud and KFUM Oslo and then as a junior player he signed for Stabæk. He played for Stabæk in the Norwegian Tippeliga, but limited playing time saw him moving to Moss ahead of the 2008 season. In January 2009, Poljac signed with the Turkish club Konyaspor.

On 2 April 2010, Poljac was seriously injured in a car accident. Poljac lost control of his car in a curve, and went off the road, landing on its roof. According to news reports, Poljac suffered serious neck injuries in the crash, and might be permananently paralyzed.

His accident shocked Turkey, since the fans and the city liked him, and saw him as great gentleman and a good player, with potential. Many fan groups, likewise ordinary Turks, are praying for him, since he was popular in the city. On the 6  April, it was first reported that he was still in a serious condition and could potentially die and that the risk for him, becoming paralyzed was as high as 90%.

Later the same day, doctors said, that he would survive the accident, whereas Branimir Poljac stated:

In order to give him moral support, a website has been created for his honour, called "Legend Poljac" where people wrote messages to him.

Poljac is currently in Norway in Sunnaas Hospital and fighting back after his accident. He is slowly regaining use of his limbs. At first he could only move his shoulders, but now he is beginning to feel his arms, and his situation has moved very fast forward. In an interview he stated that he will be back somehow, as fit as before the accident.

Konyaspor's involvement with Poljac after the accident
Konyaspor is constantly in touch with Poljac. The team bus now displays the pictures of Poljac, and the Turkish Football Federation has reimbursed the player with 100,000 Turkish liras for the accident.

References

1984 births
Living people
Norwegian footballers
Norwegian expatriate sportspeople in Turkey
Norwegian expatriate footballers
Stabæk Fotball players
IK Start players
Moss FK players
Konyaspor footballers
Eliteserien players
Süper Lig players
Expatriate footballers in Turkey
Norwegian people of Croatian descent
Footballers from Oslo
Association football forwards